Peter Lougheed Centre (PLC) is a 506,000 square foot hospital in Calgary, Alberta, Canada. It is under the auspices of Alberta Health Services, formerly the Calgary Health Region, providing medical and surgical services to Calgary but also Southern Alberta. The PLC has a 24 hours emergency department, an intensive care unit (ICU), and offers ambulatory care. It was named after Peter Lougheed, who served as premier of Alberta from 1971 to 1985. The hospital opened in 1988 with 500 beds, and today contains over 600 beds. The new East Wing was completed in 2008 and includes 140 inpatient beds, as well as a new intensive care and coronary care unit. It was also designed with a new roof-top helipad for emergency services.

Clinics
There are 34 clinics served at the PLC:
Adult Congenital Heart
Amputee
Asthma/Lung Health
Behavioral Development
Breast Feeding
Bronchoscopy
Cardiology
Cast
Cystoscopy
Diabetes in Pregnancy
Emergency Cast
Enterostomal Therapy
Family Day Medicine
Fetal Assessment
General Surgery
Geriatric Assessment
Gerontology
Hand Plastics
Hematology/Oncology
Home Parenteral Therapy Program
Minor Surgery
Neurology
Obstetrical Assessment
Outpatient Carbogen
Pacemaker
Pediatric and Adult Pre op Assessment
Private Pediatric
Psychiatric Day
Psychiatric Emergency
Psychiatric Forensic Assess
Psychiatric Outpatient Services
Rheumatology
Tracheostomy
Urgent Referral

In addition, ambulatory care includes Cardiac Diagnostics, Medicine, Respiratory, GI, [Neurodiagnostics and Gynecology Outpatient services.

Parking
Peter Lougheed Centre has four parking lots with payment options including passes: monthly ($85), weekly ($41), daily ($13) or half-hour ($2.00 per half-hour or portion) with some discounts for seniors, etc., with authorization forms. Some parking lots/stalls are designated for people with disabilities only.

See also
Health care in Calgary
Health care in Canada
List of hospitals in Canada
Libin Cardiovascular Institute of Alberta

References

External links

Peter Lougheed Centre

Hospital buildings completed in 1988
Buildings and structures in Calgary
Hospitals in Calgary
Hospitals established in 1988
Heliports in Canada
1988 establishments in Alberta
Certified airports in Alberta